Group 7 consisted of three of the 32 teams entered into the European zone: Greece, Spain, and Yugoslavia. These three teams competed on a home-and-away basis for one of the 9.5 spots in the final tournament allocated to the European zone, with the group's winner claiming the place in the finals. This group required a play-off to decide the winner.

As of 2022, this was the last time Spain failed to qualify for the World Cup finals.

Standings

Matches

 

 

 

 

 

Spain and Yugoslavia finished level on points and goal difference, and a play-off on neutral ground was played to decide who would qualify.

Notes

External links 
Group 7 Detailed Results at RSSSF

7
1972–73 in Greek football
1973–74 in Greek football
1972–73 in Spanish football
1973–74 in Spanish football
1972–73 in Yugoslav football
1973–74 in Yugoslav football